Ricarlo Erik Flanagan (March 23, 1980 – October 12, 2021) was an American actor, comedian, and rapper.

Biography
Flanagan was born in Cleveland, Ohio, on March 23, 1980. He was a semifinalist in the ninth season of Last Comic Standing. He has also acted in several television shows, including the series Shameless.

Flanagan died from complications of COVID-19 in Los Angeles, California, during the COVID-19 pandemic in California. He was 41 years old.

References

External links

1980 births
2021 deaths
People from Cleveland
Male actors from Cleveland
Male actors from Ohio
American comedians
African-American male comedians
American male comedians
Deaths from the COVID-19 pandemic in California
21st-century American male actors
21st-century African-American people